Michael Schraa (born April 17, 1961) is an American businessman and politician.

Born in Oshkosh, Wisconsin, Schraa attended University of Wisconsin Oshkosh. Schraa is a business owner and former stock broker. In November 2012, Schraa was elected to the Wisconsin State Assembly, as a Republican.

He was trained by American Majority.

References

Living people
Politicians from Oshkosh, Wisconsin
University of Wisconsin–Oshkosh alumni
Businesspeople from Wisconsin
1961 births
21st-century American politicians
Republican Party members of the Wisconsin State Assembly